Zwanegat is a hamlet in the Dutch province of South Holland and is part of the municipality Hoeksche Waard. Zwanegat lies between Westmaas and Sint Anthoniepolder.

Zwanegat is not a statistical entity, and considered part of Maasdam and Strijen. It has no place name signs, and consists of about 40 houses.

Gallery

References

Populated places in South Holland
Hoeksche Waard